Profanity in the Norwegian language is referred to in Norwegian as banneord (curse words), bannskap (cursing), obskøniteter (obscenities) or upassende språk (inappropriate language). Many words are characterized by dialect. Offensiveness of the profanities is not constant and may vary between regions.

List of some profanities in Norwegian language
 Faen is a contraction of the Norwegian word fanden, which means "the devil". It is often used as an interjection and can be translated to "fuck", though it does not refer to sex. Faen ta deg means "fuck you" or, literally, "the devil take you".
 Helvete means "hell". Dra til helvete means "go to hell".
 Jævel means "devil" and is used as a noun. Depending on context, it may also carry the meaning of "bastard", "fucker" or other, similar derogatory terms. Derived forms include jævla and jævlig, which can be used as adjectives or adverbs and would be translated into the English adjective "fucking".
 Forpulte, literally meaning "fucked" or, more accurately using the intensifying meaning of the prefix "be-", "befucked", from "pule" (to fuck/screw).
 Satan: invocation of Satan. Used as an interjection Satan! and also in the genitive form: Jeg vet ikke hvor mange ganger jeg har fått fiskesnøret fast i den satans busken, en dag så tar jeg bensin og lighter å ofrer hele jævelen til satan! ("I don't know how many times my fish-line's got stuck in that goddamn bush - one day I'll grab gasoline and a lighter and sacrifice the whole fucker to Satan!").
 Fitte means "cunt" and is used as a noun, as in jævla fitte ("fucking cunt", literally "devilled vulva") with a general meaning of "asshole".
 Fittetryne meaning "cunt face".
 Kuk or kukk, meaning "cock". It sees much of the same use as its English counterpart.
 Pikk, meaning "dick" or "prick", a generally less severe form of "kukk". Its use is more common among children and younger teens.

List of less severe profanities in Norwegian language
 Kjerring, meaning "old (ugly) woman". Considered a compliment in Northern Norway. Etymologically 'karl-ing' - small man. Also a normal word for "wife" in some dialects.
 Dritt, drit, skitt, skit, or the anglicized spelling shit  means "shit". From these, the verbs å drite and å skite have been derived, carrying the meaning of "to shit". Drit og dra (literally: "shit and pull") means "fuck off", "go fuck yourself"; it could be misunderstood as meaning "shit and go", as "dra" can also mean "leave" or "go away".
 Drittsekk, meaning "scumbag", or, literally, "shit bag".
 Drittstøvel means much the same as above. It literally translates to "shit boot".
 Fanken, from Fanden; cf. "funk", "frick", and "freak" as bowdlerisations of "fuck".
 Fy Flate, alluding to the more severe Fy Faen (Fy Fanden).
 Fillern meaning "the rag" or perhaps "rags". 'Fy fillern' is also used.
 Kuktryne, meaning "dick face".
 Kyss meg i ræva, meaning "Kiss my ass" or, literally, "kiss me in the ass"
 Hestkuk, meaning "horse cock"; particularly used in Northern Norway.
 Rævhål, also written rævhøl, meaning "asshole". Other alternative spellings include rasshøl, rasshull, and rævhull.
 Helsike, from helvete; cf. "heck" instead of "hell".
 Skinkerytter, meaning "ass-fucker", literally "ham rider"; derogatory term for male homosexuals.
 Kuksuger, meaning "cocksucker"; same as above.
 Svenskefaen, meaning "damn Swede" or "Swede bastard"; common derogatory way of referring to Swedes.
 Rovdyrkjeft, meaning "predator's maw"; alternative to fitte. Introduced by infamous Norwegian comedian Otto Jespersen.

The following are acceptable to be used in Norwegian children's cartoons:
 Hold kjeft, meaning "shut up". Is considerably more offensive in Western Norway.
 Søren, meaning "dang".
 Pokker, alternative to "søren". "Pokker ta deg" = "Pox on you". This word is often used by people who do not normally swear since it has no sexual or religious connotations.

Other profane terms include:
 Runketryne, meaning "wack-off face"; became more common after the release of the movie Terkel in Trouble.
 Mongo, or mongoloid (occasionally mongis, particularly in the Bergen area). Originating as a derogatory insult for people with Down's Syndrome, it generally means "retarded" or "stupid".
 Rompehull, meaning "butthole"; diminutive of Rævhål.
 Tissemann/tiss, generic children's names for the urinating parts, (tiss can also mean "pee") in the vein of "willy". Tissemann is only male, while tiss is unisex.

Norwegian grammar allows for virtually indefinite combinations of profanities; as is possible in other Germanic languages such as German, words may be combined into compounds. For instance, the terms kuksuger and jævel may be combined to produce the compound kuksugerjævel, meaning "cocksucking bastard".

English loanwords

Norwegian has borrowed some profane words and phrases from English. Sometimes, the word will remain the same but will have Norwegian conjugations and pronunciation. Examples include:

 Retard (common among youth, often shortened to "tard")
 Nerd
 Fuck (sometimes spelled "føkk")
 Fuckface (not very often used, but getting more and more common among Norwegian youth)

The word "fuck" as used by both the English and Norwegians today, however, is likely to originate from old Norwegian or German, fukka, which meant to have sexual intercourse. Fukka is no longer in use today.

References

External links

Profanity by language
Profanity